Derek Vonberg  (1921–2015) was a British electrical engineer, radio astronomer and medical research scientist.

Vonberg studied at Imperial College in 1942 he worked at TRE, Malvern on the development of RADAR. After the war he joined the Cavendish Laboratory in 1945 where he worked with Martin Ryle.

In the late 1940s Vonberg joined the Cyclotron Group at Hammersmith Hospital.

References

1921 births
2015 deaths
Radio astronomers
Commanders of the Order of the British Empire
British astronomers